Encheloclarias curtisoma is a species of airbreathing catfish endemic to Malaysia where it is only known from Selangor.  This species reaches a length of 8.2 cm (3.2 inches) SL.

References

 

Endemic fauna of Malaysia
Freshwater fish of Malaysia
Encheloclarias
Fish described in 1993
Taxonomy articles created by Polbot